The 2023 West Virginia Mountaineers football team will represent West Virginia University as a member of the Big 12 Conference during the 2023 NCAA Division I FBS football season. The Mountaineers will be led by fifth-year head coach Neal Brown and will play their home games at Milan Puskar Stadium in Morgantown, West Virginia.

Schedule

Game summaries

at Penn State

Statistics

Duquesne

Statistics

Pittsburgh

Statistics

Coaching staff

References

West Virginia
West Virginia Mountaineers football seasons
West Virginia Mountaineers football